Križevci pri Ljutomeru (in older sources Križovci) is a settlement in the Prlekija region in eastern Slovenia. It is the seat of the Municipality of Križevci. It is part of the traditional region of Styria and is now included in the Mura Statistical Region.

Church
The local parish church, built in the centre of the settlement, is dedicated to the Holy Cross and belongs to the Roman Catholic Diocese of Murska Sobota. It was built in 1891 with some elements of the earlier 12th- and 15th-century buildings incorporated into the current Neo-Romanesque building.

Notable people
Notable people that were born or lived in Križevci pri Ljutomeru include:
Franc Kirar (1893–1978), beekeeper

References

External links

Križevci pri Ljutomeru on Geopedia

Populated places in the Municipality of Križevci